Platylyra is a genus of North American katydids or bush crickets in the subfamily Phaneropterinae. There is one described species in Platylyra, P. californica.

References

Further reading

 

Phaneropterinae
Articles created by Qbugbot
Monotypic Orthoptera genera